is a Japanese shōjo manga series by Koromo. A Polar Bear in Love was first launched in Comico in December 2014 before being serialized in the monthly manga magazine Monthly Comic Gene beginning in June 2015.

Plot

A lost earless seal finds himself in the company of a polar bear. The polar bear falls in love with the seal, but the fearful seal constantly misinterprets his romantic advances as a strong desire to eat him.

Characters

Media

Manga

A Polar Bear in Love is written and illustrated by Koromo. The manga was first launched on the manga app Comico in December 2014. It was later serialized in the monthly magazine Monthly Comic Gene beginning in June 2015. The chapters were later released in 4 bound volumes by Kadokawa under the Monthly Comic Gene Series imprint.

In 2017, Yen Press licensed the manga for distribution in English.

Anime
An anime adaptation was announced in December 2016 as a theatrical short. The film was written and directed by Kazuya Ichikawa, with Yō Yamada in charge of sound direction and Scenario Art providing the theme song. The film was screened on March 4, 2017.

Theatrical shorts

Web shorts

Reception

Reviewers at Anime News Network praised the artwork, but had mixed opinions about the story's more serious moments.
The book came under scrutiny when parents in Orange County, California pushed to have the book banned.

References

External links

2017 anime OVAs
Gathering
Shōjo manga
Yen Press titles